Granz may refer to:

Granz, California, in Fresno County
Norman Granz (1918–2001), American music impresario